The Woman in the House is a 1942 short feature from MGM about an Englishwoman who becomes a recluse for forty years. Directed by Sammy Lee, it was the first American role for Australian film star Ann Richards.

During production it was known as Fear.

References

External links

1942 films
Metro-Goldwyn-Mayer films
American short films
American black-and-white films
1940s English-language films